Skrapež, is a river in central Serbia. Skrapež belongs to the Black Sea drainage basin. The river originates on the southeastern slope of Povlen mountain, at the confluence of two smaller rivers: Sečnica and Godljevača.

References

Bibliography
 
 

Rivers of Serbia
Zlatibor District
Kolubara District